Karel Václav Rais (January 4, 1859 – July 8, 1926) was a Czech realist novelist, author of the so-called country prose, numerous books for youth and children, and several poems.

Biography 
Rais was born into the family of a simple farm laborer and weaver. He studied in Jičín and Prague. In the latter one, since 1899, he was director of the citizen school in Vinohrady. During his life in Prague he kept in touch with many Czech artists, including Alois Jirásek, Zikmund Winter, Josef Václav Sládek, Ignát Herrmann, and Josef Thomayer.

He was one of the editors of the magazine Zvon, and wrote contributions to numerous other magazines as well. He was a member of the board of the literary company Máj and the society for national education Svatobor.

He died in 1926 and he was buried in Vinohrady Cemetery.

Selected works 
 Kalibův zločin - 1895
 Západ - 1896

See also

 List of Czech writers

References

External links

  Biography and bibliography

1859 births
1926 deaths
People from Lázně Bělohrad
People from the Kingdom of Bohemia
Czech novelists
Male novelists
Czech children's writers
Czech male poets